The Maryland National Guard Outstanding Soldier/Airman of the Year Ribbon (formerly the Maryland National Guard Outstanding Soldier/Airman/First Sergeant of the Year Ribbon) is an annual award bestowed upon outstanding individual members of the Maryland Army National Guard or the Maryland Air National Guard.

References

Awards and decorations of the National Guard (United States)
Military ribbons of the United States